Marlborough Girls' College is a state single-sex secondary school in Blenheim, New Zealand. The school was established in 1963 after splitting from Marlborough College (now Marlborough Boys' College).

History
This school was established in 1963. Previously Blenheim was served by the co-educational Marlborough College, which subsequently continued to serve as Marlborough Boys' College.

Houses
The Marlborough Girls' College has four houses:
Awatere
Ōpaoa
Kaituna
Wairau

Notable staff
 J. S. Parker – artist

Notable alumnae

 Megan Craig (born 1992), Squash player
 Sophie MacKenzie (born 1992), Olympic rower
 Anna Tempero (born 1994) gymnast at 2014 Commonwealth Games
 Jenny Shipley (née Robson, born 1952), former Prime Minister of New Zealand

References

Girls' schools in New Zealand
Schools in Blenheim, New Zealand
Educational institutions established in 1962
Secondary schools in New Zealand
1962 establishments in New Zealand
Alliance of Girls' Schools Australasia